Gerald Ford, a Republican from Michigan, was inaugurated as the nation's 38th president on August 9, 1974, upon the resignation of Richard Nixon,  and ended on January 20, 1977. The following articles cover the timeline of Ford's presidency:

 Timeline of the Gerald Ford presidency (1974)
 Timeline of the Gerald Ford presidency (1975)
 Timeline of the Gerald Ford presidency (1976–January 1977)

See also
 Timeline of the Richard Nixon presidency, for his predecessor
 Timeline of the Jimmy Carter presidency, for his successor

Ford, Gerald
Presidency of Gerald Ford